Strength athletics, also known as Strongman competitions, is a sport which tests competitors' strength in a variety of non-traditional ways. Some of the disciplines are similar to those in powerlifting and some powerlifters have also successfully competed in strongman competitions. However, strongman events also test physical endurance to a degree not found in powerlifting or other strength-based sports, such as carrying refrigerators, flipping truck tires, and pulling vehicles with a rope.

Competitions designed to test the strength of participants pre-date recorded history. The Highland games in Scotland are an early example of modern strongman competitions. Circus strongmen also performed feats of strength that were non-traditional or sensationalistic. Strongman competitions like World's Strongest Man began their television popularity in the 1970s.

History

Origins

Strength competitions pre-date written history. The first Olympics (running, throwing, jumping) were believed to be held in 776 BCE. There are records in many civilizations of feats of strength performed by great heroes, perhaps mythological, such as Heracles, Goliath, Orm Storolfsson and Milo of Croton.

Competitions that modern strongman events are modeled on, Scottish Highland Gatherings, were formalized around 1820 by Sir Walter Scott. In 1848, Queen Victoria attended the Braemar Highland Games.

In the 18th and 19th centuries, circus strongmen lent sensationalism to their acts such as bending iron bars, breaking iron chains worn around their chests, and lifting heavy objects. Famous strongmen from this era included Thomas Topham, Eugen Sandow, Louis Cyr, Thomas Inch, Arthur Saxon, Angus MacAskill, and Alexander Zass.

In the 20th century, strength sports such as weightlifting and powerlifting were popularized through the Olympic Games. However, feats of strength akin to the circus performances also gained in popularity. David Prowse (who played Darth Vader in Star Wars) was initially famous in 1964 for his lifting the famed  Dinnie Stones, the first man to do so since Donald Dinnie himself a century earlier.

Television
Perhaps the most famous event is the World's Strongest Man competition, still described by a number of highly respected authorities in the sport as the premier event in strength athletics.

The concept behind "The World's Strongest Men", as it was originally named, was developed in 1977 for CBS by Langstar Inc. David Webster, a Scot who later received an OBE for his services to sport, was the head coordinator of the competition from its inception. Dr Douglas Edmunds, seven-times Scottish shot and discus champion and twice world caber champion, worked with Webster. When Webster retired from his position, Edmunds took over. These two men were responsible for inviting the competitors and choosing the events. They selected men who had shown prowess in the mainstream fields of strength sports and field athletics events, such as shot put, American football, powerlifters, bodybuilders and wrestlers. The idea was to create a spectacle that would test competitors against one another.

The show was enough of a success that it began to be replicated in other countries, such as Britain's Strongest Man (1979). Competitors began shifting from unpaid amateurs to professional strongmen. By the end of the 20th century, and in to the 21st, other strongman programs and events were created such as Strongman Championship hosted by comedian Errol Silverman.  Other competitions have been televised, such as the World Muscle Power Championships, World Strongman Challenge, Arnold Strongman Classic, Giants Live, Highlander World Championships, World Strongman Federation, and Europe's Strongest Man.

Common disciplines

There is no set rule about what specific events will occur in a contest, except that to prevent single-event specialists from gaining an advantage, each event will be different (a single contest will not include two squat events, or two overhead lifting events, for example). Normally, a strongman contest comprises five or six events, though at the top level of competition, seven or eight events may be held. Among the most common events are:

 Farmer's Walk – competitors race along a course while carrying a heavy weight in each hand. A variation is the Giant Farmer's Walk, with a much heavier weight carried over a shorter distance.
 Hercules Hold or Pillars of Hercules – contestants stand between two pillars, pivoted to fall outwards. The competitor must simply hold them up for as long as possible.
 Vehicle pull – competitors pull a vehicle from a stationary start for a prescribed distance – fastest over the course wins. Trucks are commonly used, but larger spectacles employ trains, boats, and airplanes.
 Atlas Stones – a lifting stone event whereby five spherical concrete stones of increasing weight are placed on top of podia of varying height, beginning with the lightest stone lifted to approximately a normal person's head height. Alternatively, the stone is lifted over a bar for reps. 
 Stone Carry – in Iceland, the original stone carry was performed with the Húsafell Stone, that was to be carried for a stretch to achieve the title fullsterkur (full-strong). This stone was not round but irregular, increasing the difficulty.
 Refrigerator Carry – a staple of earlier WSM events that has made a comeback in recent years. The competitors carry two refrigerators, attached to an iron bar they hold on their shoulders, and walk it across the finish line as fast as they can.
 Carry and Drag – an object (usually a heavy anchor) is run across half of the course. The competitors then must attach it to a chain of almost equal weight and pull it across the rest of the course.
 Fingal's Fingers – under a timer, lift and flip a series of progressively heavier, hinged poles from a horizontal starting position.

Major titles and title holders

See also
 Strongwoman
 High striker
 Strength athletics in the United Kingdom and Ireland
 Strongman (strength athlete)
 World's Strongest Man
 World Strongman Federation
 Beauty and the Beast was billed as the World Strongman Challenge.
 List of strongmen
 International Federation of Strength Athletes ("IFSA")
 History of physical training and fitness

References

External links
 World's Strongest Man
 Old Time Strongman Training
 United States All Round Weightlifting Association

 
Individual sports